Kamma Vari Palem is a village in Krishna district of Andhra Pradesh state in southern India.  The main occupation is agriculture.

The village is surrounded by the Muneru and Vireru lakes.

References 

Villages in Krishna district